Thiothionyl fluoride is a chemical compound of fluorine and sulfur and an isomer of disulfur difluoride.

Preparation 
Thiothionyl fluoride can be obtained from the reaction between disulfur dichloride with potassium fluoride at about 150 °C or with mercury(II) fluoride at 20 °C.

 S2Cl2 + 2 KF → SSF2 + 2 KCl

Another possible preparation is by the reaction of nitrogen trifluoride with sulfur.

 NF3 + 3 S → SSF2 + NSF

It also forms from disulfur difluoride when in contact with alkali metal fluorides.

Properties 
Thiothionyl fluoride is a colorless gas. At high temperatures and pressures, it decomposes into sulfur tetrafluoride and sulfur.

 2 SSF2 → SF4 + 3 S

With hydrogen fluoride, it forms sulfur tetrafluoride and hydrogen sulfide.

 SSF2 + 2 HF → SF4, + H2S

References 

Sulfur compounds
Fluorine compounds